Anchovies is a collaboration studio album by American rappers Planet Asia and Apollo Brown. It was released on August 25, 2017 under Mello Music Group.

Track listing

Accolades

References

2017 albums
Mello Music Group albums
Albums produced by Apollo Brown